Rocanville Airport formerly  was a registered aerodrome located  north-east of Rocanville, Saskatchewan, Canada.

See also 
 List of airports in Saskatchewan
 List of defunct airports in Canada

References 

Defunct airports in Saskatchewan
Rocanville No. 151, Saskatchewan